Eugene Roland Kellersberger (August 6, 1888 – January 28, 1966) was an American physician who was a pioneer in the treatment of leprosy and a missionary surgeon in Africa. In addition to his medical research, he fought to reduce the stigma of leprosy.

Biography

Kellersberger was born in Cypress Mill, Blanco County, Texas to Julius Rudolph Kellersberger and Helene Matern. He was educated at Whitis Academy in Austin, Texas, and received his B.A. from the University of Texas at Austin in 1911, followed by his M.D. in 1915 from Washington University School of Medicine. For his work in the Belgian Congo, he was awarded the Chevalier Royal Order of the Lion in 1936, the Chevalier Royal Order of the Crown in 1940, and Officer of the Royal Order of the Crown in 1957.

Archival collections 

The Presbyterian Historical Society in Philadelphia has the collection of Eugene R. Kellersberger's papers, including diaries, scrapbooks and biography, correspondence, medical work, personal papers, and photographic and related textual materials.

References

Hendrick, John and Winifred Vass. 1998. "Kellersberger, Eugene." Biographical Dictionary of Christian Mission, Gerald Anderson, ed., pp. 356–357. New York: Simon & Schuster Macmillan.
Vass, Winifred K. (1999). Doctor Not Afraid, 2nd ed. Dallas, TX.

1888 births
1966 deaths
People from Blanco County, Texas
American people of German descent
20th-century American physicians
American infectious disease physicians
University of Texas at Austin alumni
Washington University School of Medicine alumni